Johnny Hyde (23 April 1895 – 18 December 1950) was an American talent agent who developed the career of Marilyn Monroe.

Early life 
Hyde was born to a Jewish family as Iván Haidabura in Russia and moved to the United States in April 1898.

Career 
Hyde was the vice-president of the William Morris Agency's West Coast office during the 1930s and 1940s and represented some of the biggest names in the entertainment industry. In 1949 he met then-unknown actress and model Marilyn Monroe when she was being photographed by Hollywood pin-up photographer Bruno Bernard at the Racquet Club of Palm Springs. Taking her on as a client, he had her undergo minor plastic surgery, and used his influence to help her land the roles of Angela in The Asphalt Jungle and Miss Caswell in All About Eve. The buzz generated by her performances enabled Hyde to negotiate a contract for Monroe with 20th Century Fox. Just a few days after securing the contract, Hyde died of a heart attack aged 55.

Despite the fact that Monroe was nearly 31 years his junior, Hyde eventually left his wife for her. He wanted to marry her, but she repeatedly refused his marriage proposals; she said she loved Hyde, but was not actually in love with him.

Death and legacy 
Hyde died on 18 December 1950.

He was survived by his third wife, actress Mozelle Cravens (1914–2004) and his four sons. Two from his first marriage to Florence Harper and two from Cravens.

Hyde was played by Ron Rifkin in Norma Jean & Marilyn, Richard Basehart in the TV movie Marilyn: The Untold Story, Joel Gray in the TV movie Marilyn and Me, and Lloyd Bridges in the TV miniseries Moviola episode "This Year's Blonde".

References 

1895 births
1950 deaths
Place of birth missing
Place of death missing
Hollywood talent agents
American people of Russian-Jewish descent
Emigrants from the Russian Empire to the United States